Nicola Jayne Cousins (born 22 October 1988) is a footballer who plays as a defender for Lewes in the FA Women's Championship and the Wales national team.

International career
Cousins won 13 caps for Wales at under-19 level, scoring one goal. She then made her senior debut on 23 November 2006 in UEFA Women's Euro 2009 qualifying, in a 2–1 win over Kazakhstan at Stadion Mladost, Strumica.

References

External links
 
 
 
 Nicola Cousins profile at Cardiff City LFC

1988 births
Living people
Yeovil Town L.F.C. players
Wales women's international footballers
Welsh women's footballers
Women's Super League players
Cardiff City Ladies F.C. players
FA Women's National League players
Women's association football defenders